Kardo Bestilo (born in 1976) is an Angolan writer, member of the Arts Movement LEV´ARTE born a year after the country gained independence from Portugal. He writes in Portuguese and English.

Books 
 ControVerso (Poetry), edited by Europress Editores, 2006.

References

External links
 Official web site
 An anthology of poems on life and love, mainly in Portuguese, from Kardo Bestilo, one of the cornerstones of the Angolan spoken word movement.
 Quero despertar outros talentos para a escrita
 A zungueira e a "poética" da sobrevivência
 As guerras não impediram o surgimento de alguns escritores angolanos que deram vida obras de grande qualidade e extraordinárias beleza e expressividade.
 O Encantar do Lev’Arte
 Poetry books by Europress

1976 births
Living people
Angolan writers